Rafael Ben-Ari' (Hebrew: רפאל בן-ארי b. 1971) is an Israeli-born international independent content creator master photographer and filmmaker, specializing in photojournalism and travel photography, known for his war and combat zone photos and on location travel photography from around the world. In 2019 he was named one of the top 10 Best Stock Photographers in the world by Pouted Magazine.

Rafael's photography work is well recognized and his images appears in a large number of publications, magazines and websites on a daily basis all over the world. Among them: Time Magazine,  The National Geographic, Travel + Leisure, Lonely Planet, The New York Times, NBC News, The Washington Post, Rolling Stone, Newsweek, The Guardian ,The Telegraph, Rough Guides, DK Eyewitness Travel Guides & Travel Books, Encyclopedia Britannica. Rafael Ben-Ari has exhibited his photography work in Israel, Australia, New Zealand, France, Mexico and Italy.

Awards 
2016 Awarded 3rd Place for Nikon Photo Day New Zealand
2016 Awarded Pond5 Photography Photographer Ambassador 
2014 1st place Crowd vote and 2nd place Expert’s choice in "Crowds" photo contest by Nikon N-Photo magazine and Photocrowd
2007 Photo published in Doubletruck Magazine "World's Best News Pictures"
2006 Excellent Artist in photography Grant from the Ministry of Education and Culture of Israel Government
2005 Excellent Artist in photography Grant from the Ministry of Education and Culture of Israel Government

Exhibitions 
2011 "Unexpected Israel" - Milan, Italy
2011 "Cultural Friends" exhibition for customs and traditions around the world - Paseo de la Reforma (Reform Promenade) - Mexico City, Mexico
2010 "Stories of Israel: A Photographed Journey to the Country's Soul" - Group Exhibition in Embassies Worldwide
2010 "Tel Aviv: The City that Emerged from the Dunes" - Mexican Senate Headquarters, Mexico City
2010 "Tel Aviv: The City that Emerged from the Dunes" - Fine Arts Metro, Mexico City
2008 "During the 60 years of Israel" - Marseille, France
2008 "live in Israel" - Marseille, France
2008 "Jerusalem- the heart of Israel" - Marseille, France
2003 "Untitled" - Paihia, New Zealand
2003 "The Decisive Moment" - Kerikeri, New Zealand
2002 "A Thin Line trade" - Melbourne, Australia

Published works 
Photo and biography published in Fotografos En La Calle "Photographers in Israel" Book
Photography and article about Rafael Ben-Ari published in "Scoop Magazine"

Education 
2003 - Rescue diving and underwater photography from Padi Bay of Islands New Zealand
1999 - Studies Bachelor of fine arts (B.F.A) in Bezalel Academy of Arts and Design - Jerusalem Israel
1995 - Professional photography and Photojournalism in New York Institute of Photography - New York USA

References

External links 
 Rafael Ben-Aris' official photography website
 Rafael Ben-Aris' official photography instagram
 Artist for Israel Museum
 "Photographers notes from the field" on Digital Journalist
 "The Most Successful Stock Photographers Photography Tips"
 "Best Advice from the most Successful Stock Photographers"
 "Rafael Ben Ari named one of the Top 10 Best Stock Photographers in The World" on Pouted Magazine

Biographies 
 Biography on Newscom
 Biography on Rafael Ben-Ari official site

Israeli photojournalists
Living people
Year of birth missing (living people)